Justin Raleigh is an American make-up artist. He is best known for his work on The Eyes of Tammy Faye, Aquaman, Army of the Dead, Impeachment: American Crime Story, American Horror Story: Freak Show and Westworld.

Justin is the founder and CEO of the special makeup effects and specialty costume studio Fractured FX Inc.

Filmography

 Aquaman and the Lost Kingdom (2022)
 Kimi (2022)
 American Crime Story (2021)
 Midnight Mass (2021)
 The Eyes of Tammy Faye (2021; co-won with Linda Dowds and Stephanie Ingram)
 Malignant (2021)
 Lisey's Story (2021)
 Sweet Tooth (2021)
 Army of the Dead (2021)
 Penny Dreadful: City of Angels (2020)
 Westworld (2018-2020)
 Eli (2019)
 The Laundromat (2019)
 Swamp Thing (2019)
 Big Little Lies (2019)
 Annabelle Comes Home (2019)
 Brightburn (2019)
 Aquaman (2018)
 Electric Dreams (2018)
 Insidious: The Last Key (2018)
 Godless (2017)
 Midnight, Texas (2017)
 Logan Lucky (2017)
 Battle for Skyark (2017)
 Outcast (2017)
 Rosewood (2015-2017)
 Doubt (2017)
 Incarnate (2016)
 Viral (2016)
 The Conjuring 2 (2016)
 In a Valley of Violence (2016)
 Supergirl (2015-2016)
 Mortal Kombat X: Generations (2015)
 The Last Witch Hunter (2015)
 Insidious: Chapter 3 (2015)
 The Lazarus Effect (2015)

 Demonic (2015)
 The Knick (2014-2015)
 American Horror Story (2014-2015)
 Dark Hearts (2014)
 Mercy (2014)
 300: Rise of an Empire (2014)
 Cooties (2014)
 Insidious: Chapter 2 (2013)
 The Conjuring (2013)
 3 Geezers! (2013)
 Beneath (2013)
 Bad Milo! (2013)
 Dark Skies (2013)
 True Blood (2011-2012)
 Paralyzed (2011)
 Wonder Woman (2011)
 Archetype (2011)
 Sucker Punch (2011)
 The Resident (2011)
 Insidious (2010)
 Cabin Fever 2: Spring Fever (2009)
 Allure (2009)
 Dark Planet (2008)
 Splinter (2008)
 Boogeyman 2 (2007)
 30 Days of Night: Blood Trails (2007)
 The Evidence (2006)
 Alpha Dog (2006)
 Threshold (2006)
 Jarhead (2005)
 The 9th Company (2005)
 Bad Girls from Valley High (2005)
 Hellbent (2004)
 Big Fish (2003)
 Bloody Murder (2000)

Awards and nominations

References

External links
 
 

Living people
American make-up artists
Best Makeup Academy Award winners
Primetime Emmy Award winners
Year of birth missing (living people)
Best Makeup BAFTA Award winners